Hannibal is a psychological horror novel by American author Thomas Harris, published in 1999. It is the third in his series featuring Dr. Hannibal Lecter and the second to feature FBI Special Agent Clarice Starling. The novel takes place seven years after the events of The Silence of the Lambs and deals with the intended revenge of one of Lecter's victims. It was adapted as a film of the same name in 2001, directed by Ridley Scott. Elements of the novel were incorporated into the second season of the NBC television series Hannibal, while the show's third season adapted the plot of the novel.

Synopsis 
Seven years after the Buffalo Bill case, FBI agent Clarice Starling witnesses her career crumble around her. During a botched drug raid, Starling kills a meth dealer who was holding a baby. Fugitive serial killer Hannibal Lecter, who has been living in Florence, Italy under an assumed name, sends her a letter of condolence and requests more information about her personal life. Desperate to catch Lecter, the FBI tasks Starling with apprehending him. She meets with Barney, a former orderly of Baltimore State Hospital for the Criminally Insane. When Barney asks Starling if she ever feared Lecter visiting her, she replied that she did not, as "he said he wouldn't".

Meanwhile, Mason Verger, a wealthy, sadistic pedophile whom Lecter disfigured during a therapy session years before, plans to get revenge by feeding Lecter to wild boars, using Starling as bait. He is aided by corrupt Justice Department agent Paul Krendler, Starling's nemesis. Rinaldo Pazzi, a disgraced Italian detective, pursues Lecter in the interests of collecting Verger's bounty on him. However, Lecter disembowels and hangs Pazzi in reference to the lynchings of the Pazzi conspirators. After killing one of Verger's men, Lecter escapes to the United States, where he begins pursuing Starling.

The novel briefly touches upon Lecter's childhood, specifically the death of his younger sister, Mischa. The two were orphaned during World War II, and a group of deserters killed and ate Mischa, something that haunts Lecter.

Barney briefly works for Verger, meeting Verger's sister and bodyguard Margot, a lesbian bodybuilder whom Verger molested and raped as a child. Her father disinherited her after learning of her homosexuality. Margot, who is infertile, tells him that she works for her brother because she needs Mason's sperm to have a child with her partner, Judy Ingram, and inherit the Verger family fortune.

Verger's men capture Lecter, and Starling pursues them. When Starling catches up to Lecter, she is able to cut him free before succumbing to tranquilizer darts shot by one of Verger's men. The boars are unleashed by Lecter; they feed on the henchmen that Starling had already shot dead or incapacitated but ignore Lecter when they smell no fear on him. In the confusion, Lecter carries the unconscious Starling to safety and escapes. At the same time, Margot releases one of the henchmen and kills another, then obtains Mason's sperm by sodomizing him with a cattle prod and murders him by shoving his pet moray eel into his mouth. Lecter, who had briefly treated Margot after her brother abused her, had urged her to blame the murder on him, so she leaves a piece of Lecter's scalp at the scene.

Using a regimen of psychoactive drugs and behavioral therapy in the course of a series of therapy sessions, Lecter attempts to help Starling heal from her childhood trauma and her pent-up anger at the injustices of the world. One day, as a favor to Lecter, Margot Verger lures Krendler to a park where Lecter is waiting. Lecter is able to capture Krendler and proceeds to lobotomize him during a dinner in which he and Starling eat Krendler's prefrontal cortex before Lecter kills him. After the dinner, Starling partially undresses and offers one of her breasts to Lecter. Lecter goes down on a knee before Starling, accepting her offer. The two then become lovers and disappear together.

Three years later, Barney and his girlfriend go to Buenos Aires to see a Johannes Vermeer painting. At the opera, Barney spots Lecter and Starling; fearing for his life, he flees with his girlfriend.

Lecter and Starling are seen living together in an "exquisite" Beaux Arts mansion, where they employ servants and engage in activities such as learning new languages and dancing together and building their own respective memory palaces. Moreover, the reader is told that "Sex is a splendid structure they add to every day", that the psychoactive drugs "have had no part in their lives for a long time", and that Lecter is "satisfied" with the fact that Mischa cannot return.

Reception 
The ending was controversial and the reaction to the novel was mixed. Robert McCrum, writing in The Guardian, called it "the exquisite satisfaction of a truly great melodrama." Author Stephen King, a fan of the series, has said that he considers Hannibal to be one of the two most frightening popular novels of modern times, the other being The Exorcist.

Charles de Lint criticized Hannibal as a huge disappointment, citing "its disturbing subtexts, which... set [Lecter] up as a sympathetic character," and Harris' "twisting [Starling] so out of character simply to provide a 'shock' ending."  Martin Amis was extremely critical of the book (having been impressed by Harris' earlier Lecter novels) and wrote that "Harris has become a serial murderer of English sentences, and Hannibal is a necropolis of prose."

The first printing of Hannibal was 1.3 million copies. It was the second highest bestselling novel in 1999.

Adaptations
 A film adaptation was released in 2001 through MGM and Universal Studios. Most of the cast of The Silence of the Lambs, particularly Jodie Foster, outright rejected involvement with the project, in part because of their disagreement with the novel's alteration of Starling's character. The film was directed by Ridley Scott, and starred Anthony Hopkins (the only returning actor, other than Frankie Faison) as Lecter, Julianne Moore as Starling, Gary Oldman as Verger, and Giancarlo Giannini as Pazzi. David Mamet and Steven Zaillian wrote the screenplay for the film.
 Elements of the novel are featured in the NBC television series Hannibal, which features Mads Mikkelsen as Lecter, as well as Hugh Dancy as Red Dragon character Will Graham, who appears as the protagonist instead of Starling. The second half of the series' second season features Katharine Isabelle as Margot Verger and Michael Pitt as Mason Verger, and shows how Verger was disfigured by Lecter. The plot of the novel is adapted into the first half of the series' third season, with Isabelle returning as Margot, Joe Anderson as Verger, Fortunato Cerlino as Pazzi and Glenn Fleshler as Cordell Doemling.

Characters 
 Hannibal Lecter
 Clarice Starling
 Mason Verger
 Margot Verger
 Jack Crawford
 Rinaldo Pazzi
 Paul Krendler
 Barney
 Cordell
 Oreste Pini
 Carlo Deogracias
 Romula Cjesku
 Gnocco
 Ardelia Mapp
 Evelda Drumgo
 John Brigham
 Marquez Burke
 John Hare
 Officer Bolton

References 
Notes

Bibliography

 

1999 American novels
Delacorte Press books
Hannibal Lecter novels
Sequel novels
American novels adapted into films
American novels adapted into television shows
Novels about the Federal Bureau of Investigation
Fratricide in fiction
Incest in fiction
Pedophilia in literature
Novels about serial killers
Novels set in Florence
Novels with lesbian themes